The Westbound Train is a short story by Willa Cather. It was first published in Courier in September 1899.

Plot summary
Mrs Johnston stops at Cheyenne, Wyoming train station to collect a ticket for her next train to San Francisco. She has come all the way from New York City to join her husband, a railroad official. However, the Station Agent claims he has already given her ticket to a Mrs Johnston, with confirmation by telegram from Mr Johnston, and that she might write her a note. The other woman's reply says that her name is actually Johnson (without a 't') and that Mr Johnston is coming to pick her up at Cheyenne so they can travel to San Francisco together. Infuriated, Sybil decides to take a train back to New York City; she thinks her husband has been cheating on her, and that this is the ultimate insult. However, she is met by her husband and he explains Sally is a friend whom she had met at a wedding sometime later. The couple make up and meet the other woman.

Characters
Reginald Johnston, 'a railroad official'.
Sybil Johnston, Reginald's wife. Her maiden name is Ingrahame.
Station Agent
Messenger Boy
Mrs Sally Johnson. Her maiden name is Toppinger. Her husband died on a boat excursion. She is blond and blue-eyed; Syvil deems her 'common'.
Margaret Villers
Alberta Frick
Cicely Fanshawe
Marchesi

References to other works
Sybil fancies Sally and her husband to gossip about her as characters in novels by Honoré de Balzac do.

References to actual history
Sybil dismisses Sally's letter as Volapük, a trendy language at the time.

References

External links 
Full Text at the Willa Cather Archive

1899 short stories
Short stories by Willa Cather
Works originally published in the Lincoln Courier